Vaasa Market Hall is an Gothic-style market hall in the city center of Vaasa, Finland. The market hall includes seven different shops, such as the fish store Ruostsala Snickars and the café Wasa Konditori.

The first part, the so-called lower hall, was completed in 1902, and the latter part, the so-called upper hall, which was also built according to Stenfors' drawings, was completed in 1927. The access between the two was opened in 1963. The developer and owner of the market hall is Halli Oy, which was founded by Stenfors, court council Oskar Rewell and bank manager K. H. Majantie in 1900.

See also 
 Oulu Market Hall
 Tampere Market Hall
 Turku Market Hall

References

External links 

Vaasa Market Hall – Official Site

Vaasa
Buildings and structures in Ostrobothnia (region)
Market_halls
Commercial_buildings_completed_in_1902
Buildings_and_structures_completed_in_1902